Predators is a 2010 American science fiction action film directed by Nimród Antal, written by Alex Litvak and Michael Finch and starring Adrien Brody, Laurence Fishburne, Alice Braga, Walton Goggins, and Topher Grace. It was distributed by 20th Century Fox. It is the third movie installment of the Predator franchise. The film follows an ensemble cast of characters including Royce (Adrien Brody), a mercenary who appears in an unidentified jungle among other proficient killers. They find that they have been abducted and placed on a planet that acts as a game reserve for two warring tribes of extraterrestrial killers, and actively look for a way back to Earth.

Producer Robert Rodriguez had developed a script for a third installment as early as 1994, although it was not until 2009 that 20th Century Fox greenlit the project. According to Rodriguez, the title Predators is an allusion to the second film in the Alien franchise, Aliens (1986). The title also has a double meaning, referring both to the extraterrestrial Predator creatures and to the group of human characters who are pitted against them. Principal photography for Predators began on September 28, 2009, and concluded after 53 days; filming took place in Hawaii and then in Austin, Texas.

Predators was released in the United States on July 9, 2010. It grossed $127 million worldwide and received mixed reviews from critics, with praise for the action but criticism aimed at the thinly written characters. A fourth film, titled The Predator, was released in 2018, and a prequel, Prey, in 2022.

Plot

Royce awakens to find himself free falling into an unfamiliar jungle and meets several others who arrive in the same manner: Los Zetas cartel enforcer Cuchillo, Spetsnaz soldier Nikolai, IDF sniper Isabelle, RUF officer Mombasa, San Quentin death row inmate Stans, Yakuza member Hanzo, and physician Edwin. The group follows Royce, whom Isabelle suspects is a former black operations soldier turned mercenary. In the jungle, they find a strange monument, empty cages, and deadfall traps set by a deceased Green Beret. Reaching higher ground, they find themselves staring at an alien sky and realize they are not on Earth.

After surviving an attack from a pack of quadrupedal alien beasts, Royce deduces they are on a moon used as a game preserve, where humans and other species are hunted. Cuchillo is killed, and his body is used to lure the survivors into a trap, which they avoid. The group follows the beasts' tracks to a camp and finds a captive Predator. Their hunters, three larger Predators known as "Tracker", "Berserker" and "Falconer", attack the group, killing Mombasa while the others escape. Isabelle recognizes the Predator as matching the description of a similar creature that killed a special operations team in 1987 in Guatemala, but was defeated by a single survivor.

The group encounters Ronald Noland, a solitary U.S. Air Cavalry soldier who has survived on the moon for "ten seasons" by hiding and scavenging from the Predators and their victims. He takes the group to his hideout and explains that the Predators hunt in threes, sharpening their killing skills by abducting worthy prey from other worlds and bringing them to the planet. Noland also reveals that there is a blood feud between the Predators. Royce devises a plan to free the captive Predator, hoping it will take them home.

Having gone mad, Noland traps the others and attempts to use smoke to suffocate them, hoping to kill them for their equipment. Royce uses an explosive to attract the Predators to the hideout. Noland is killed by the "Tracker", who releases the group. In the ensuing chase, Nikolai sacrifices himself to kill the "Tracker" and save Edwin. The survivors are intercepted by the "Berserker", but Stans distracts it, allowing the others to escape before he is killed. Hanzo stays behind to duel the "Falconer" with a katana he took from Noland's stash, killing it before dying from his wounds.

Royce, Isabelle, and Edwin continue to head for the Predators' camp, hoping to enact Royce's plan, until Edwin is injured by a trap. When Isabelle refuses to abandon him, Royce leaves them both behind. They are caught by the "Berserker", who traps them in a pit and continues to the camp. Royce frees the captive Predator in exchange for transport to Earth. The Predator dons its armor and activates the ship with its wrist computer, setting a course for Earth. Royce runs to the ship as the "Berserker" arrives, eventually overpowering and decapitating the other Predator before using its own wrist computer to destroy the ship, seemingly killing Royce. Edwin paralyzes Isabelle using neurotoxic poison from a plant he found earlier and reveals he is a serial killer and his intention to stay on the planet. Royce appears and uses the poison on Edwin before booby-trapping him with grenades to use him as bait to injure the "Berserker". With Isabelle's help, Royce defeats and decapitates the "Berserker". Seeing more parachutes in the distance and surmising more Predators are arriving, the pair head into the jungle.

Cast

 Adrien Brody as Royce, a former U.S. Special Operations Forces veteran turned mercenary who reluctantly assumes leadership of the group of humans. Brody claimed he had been "blown away" by Predator and viewed his role as a challenge, wanting to bring a complexity to the character that would contrast with Schwarzenegger's role in the original film. But that's not really why I'm in it and that's not really what I brought to it. I brought the same kind of discipline that I would to a film like The Pianist." Antal and Rodriguez specifically wanted to avoid casting an actor physically similar to Schwarzenegger, wanting to "go in a very different direction" and reasoning that real-life soldiers are wiry and tough rather than burly. "We thought casting a physically 'Schwarzenegger-esque' character would have done the original film a disservice", said Antal, "and would have done this film a disservice because we are not trying to remake or copy the original film. I told everybody early on that I can make anybody look tough. What I can't do is teach them how to act". Brody has expressed interest in reprising his role in future sequels.
 Topher Grace as Edwin, a doctor who does not seem to belong amongst the group of hardened killers until he reveals that he is also a psychopathic murderer. Grace was dubious about taking the role when he read the script, "because I really liked the first Predator, but all the sequels haven't been as good. Then when I read this, I thought, 'What Aliens was to Alien, this is to Predator. Because Predator never really got its due; it never really got that sequel". He compared Antal's approach to that of James Cameron, director of Aliens; remaining faithful to the original work but taking the concepts in slightly different directions. Grace performed some of his own stunts, including jumping off a waterfall.
 Alice Braga as Isabelle, a sniper from the Israel Defense Forces. She failed to save her spotter during a mission, and feels that she has been brought to the alien planet as punishment and to seek redemption. As the only female character, Isabelle plays the role of peacemaker: "My character, funny enough", said Braga, "is the one that is always trying to grab everyone together and like reuniting everyone and stopping the fights and saying that we have strength in numbers". Braga described the character as "a tough cookie … sweet inside but tough outside". She read a sniper manual to prepare for the role, and carried a fourteen-pound sniper rifle during shooting.
 Walton Goggins as Stans, a death row inmate from San Quentin State Prison who was scheduled to be executed in two days before suddenly finding himself on the alien planet. Responsible for 38 murders and an admitted rapist.
 Oleg Taktarov as Nikolai, a Russian commando from the Spetsnaz Alpha Group who was fighting in Chechnya before finding himself on the alien planet. Taktarov, a retired mixed martial artist and former Ultimate Fighting Champion, described his role as combining elements of Schwarzenegger, Jesse Ventura, and Bill Duke's characters from the original Predator film, and praised it as "the first time you get a really, really, positive, good Russian character in an American [film]". Taktarov used his martial arts training during some of the film's action sequences. While filming a scene he hit his face on a steadicam and was bleeding, but continued filming because the blood added to the effect of the scene.
 Laurence Fishburne as Noland, a United States Army Air Cavalry soldier who has survived on the alien planet for multiple hunting cycles. "It's a really interesting role," said Fishburne, "quite different from Morpheus [from The Matrix]. He's a bit shady, crazy, surviving on his own, kind of a ratty character."
 Danny Trejo as 'Cuchillo', a ruthless enforcer for the feared Los Zetas Mexican drug cartel who carries twin submachine guns.
 Louis Ozawa Changchien as Hanzo, a Yakuza Inagawa-kai enforcer who rarely speaks and reveals late in the film that he is missing his leftmost two fingers, having performed yubitsume. "I guess he used to be a guy who can murder someone without a qualm," said Changchien of the character, "but by the time he arrives [on the alien planet], he'll no longer be that kind of person. Those things aren't explained in the script, but you'll get it when you see the movie." Changchien used his kendo training for a scene in which his character uses a katana in a duel against a Predator. Antal, a kendo fan, insisted that the sword fight look authentic.
 Mahershala Ali as Mombasa, a Revolutionary United Front death squad soldier from Sierra Leone.

The four Predators in the film are portrayed by Derek Mears, Carey Jones, and Brian Steele. The Predators are identified in the film's credits as the "Classic Predator", "Tracker Predator", "Falconer Predator", and "Berserker Predator". Mears plays the Classic Predator, designed to resemble the creature in the original film. Steele plays the Berserker and Falconer Predators, two of the larger Predators hunting the humans. The Berserker Predator is identified by a xenomorph mandible attached to its helmet and faces off against Royce in the film's climax, while the Falconer Predator controls a flying reconnaissance drone and is killed by Hanzo. Jones plays the Tracker Predator, identified by a pair of tusks attached to its helmet, which controls the quadrupedal hunting animals and is killed by Nikolai. Jones also doubled for Steele in some scenes as the Berserker and Falconer Predators.

Production

Development
The film was produced by Robert Rodriguez and written by Alex Litvak and Michael Finch. In 1994, Rodriguez wrote an early script for a third Predator film for 20th Century Fox while he was working on Desperado at the time. Rodriguez presented the script to the studio, but was denied when they realized that the budget would be too large. Fifteen years later, the studio decided to go with his script. Rodriguez stated:

It's the story from that script I had written way back then. They had hired me to write a Predator story while I was waiting to do Desperado back in 1995. It was crazy, this thing I came up with. So then fast-forward to now and, like, six months ago, they found the script and called me up. 'Hey, we want to redo this franchise and we found your old script. This is where we should have gone with the series! We want to move forward.' And that's what we're doing.

In 2009, 20th Century Fox studio executive, Alex Young, called Rodriguez to consider using his treatment to revive the individual Predator franchise. The film was produced at Rodriguez's Troublemaker Studios as opposed to 20th Century Fox so that Rodriguez had more creative control over the film. It was originally thought that Rodriguez would direct, but on July 1, 2009, Nimród Antal was officially signed on to direct.

Rodriguez and Antal originally said they wanted the film to be a sequel only to the original Predator as the film is trying to distance itself from Predator 2 and the first two Alien vs. Predator films.

Casting

At the 2009 San Diego Comic-Con International Rodriguez stated that Predators would feature an ensemble cast, and that the most important element of the film would be "great characters so that the audience feels they're going on this journey with them". He also noted that the title had a double meaning, referring not only to the extraterrestrial hunters but also to the human characters, all of whom are dangerous killers. He and Antal wanted each of the characters to be well-developed enough to be able to stand alone. Rodriguez hoped to have Arnold Schwarzenegger play a cameo role as Dutch, his character from the original Predator film, but this ultimately did not happen.

Filming
The film was shot on a 53-day schedule. Exterior filming location was mostly set in Kolekole, Hawaii. Filming started on September 28, 2009. The film wrapped up its 22-day shoot on the Hawaii location on November 1, 2009. The film shot its interior set scenes at Robert Rodriguez's studio in Austin, Texas. Sixty percent of the film was shot in Texas in order to be eligible for a tax benefit. The film shot more exterior footage at Canyon Lake Gorge in Comal County and Hamilton Pool Preserve.

Special effects

Tom Woodruff Jr. and Alec Gillis, head of special effects studio Amalgamated Dynamics, Inc. (ADI), who previously worked on 2004's Alien vs. Predator and 2007's Aliens vs. Predator: Requiem, did not return for the creature design of Predators, nor did Stan Winston Studios. Instead, KNB EFX's Howard Berger and Greg Nicotero took over building the creature suits. Berger, who worked with Winston on the original Predator, stated that the studio is reprising the original Stan Winston design of the Predator in the film, saying "We wanted to have the Predator look as it did in the original film. We went back and looked at the original … everyone's going to be very happy that we've been very faithful to the Stan Winston designs."
In addition to the original Predator designs, the film features many new creatures never before seen in a Predator film, such as a new breed of Predators that belong to a different tribe, alien creatures that have been domesticated by the Predators for use in hunting, and other alien creatures that have been brought to the planet by the Predators to be used as prey.

Music

There had been speculation that original Predator composer Alan Silvestri would return to do the score, but on February 26, 2010, it was announced that John Debney, who worked with Rodriguez on such films as Spy Kids and Sin City, would compose the original score for the film.

Rodriguez shared his thoughts on how the score should play out saying:

Debney recorded many custom sounds and instruments, including Tibetan long horns to create squeals and screams. He also manipulated metal scrapes and ethnic percussion to further highlight the advanced yet brutal and primitive quality of the Predators and their world. Debney also put up a sneak-peek of one of the Predators scoring sessions.
La-La Land Records released the original score for the film on July 5, 2010. The song "Long Tall Sally" by Little Richard plays during the credits; it was also used in the original Predator film.

Release

Theatrical
It was announced on March 3, 2010, that Robert Rodriguez and Nimród Antal would reveal a "first look" at Predators at the SXSW Film Festival in Austin, Texas on March 12, at 10:15pm. Rodriguez expressed his excitement about the event, saying, "My director Nimród Antal and I are excited to bring this first look at Predators to Austin's SXSW Film Festival, an event that's become vital to the filmmaking scene. Austin is my home and I'm proud that Predators was conceived and filmed here."

Home media
Predators was released on DVD and Blu-ray formats on October 19, 2010. Both releases include commentary tracks by Robert Rodriguez and Nimród Antal, motion comics, and behind-the-scenes-features. The Blu-ray edition includes additional behind-the-scenes features as well as deleted and extended scenes.

Reception

Box office

Released on July 9, 2010, in the United States, Predators opened with $10 million on Friday. The film finished third at the box office with $24.8 million during its first weekend, behind Despicable Me and The Twilight Saga: Eclipse. The film was released internationally on July 8, 2010 and had its biggest success in the markets of the UK and Ireland with $6.8 million and Japan with $6.3 million. The film has grossed $52 million in the United States and $75.2 million internationally, for a worldwide total of $127.2 million.

Critical response

Review aggregate website Rotten Tomatoes reports that 65% of 205 critics gave the film a positive review, with an average rating of 5.8/10. The site's critical consensus reads: "After a string of subpar sequels, this bloody, action-packed reboot takes the Predator franchise back to its testosterone-fueled roots." Another review aggregation website Metacritic assigned the film a weighted average score of 51 out of 100, based on 30 critics, indicating "mixed or average reviews". Audiences polled by CinemaScore gave the film an average grade of "C+" on an A+ to F scale.

A. O. Scott of The New York Times said, "Antal is a good enough action director that some of the combat is pretty exciting." On the other hand, Michael Phillips of the Chicago Tribune wrote, "When the story relocates to the Fishburne character's grimy, claustrophobic domicile, the movie turns static. The filmmakers may have been going for an Alien industrial-grunge vibe, but the tension just isn't sufficient."

The primary complaint leveled against the film is the failure, as film critic Roger Ebert of the Chicago Sun-Times described, of the cast to capture the "quiet suspense" of the original Predator film.
Chris Nashawaty of Entertainment Weekly complained that the film's characters were more like "cardboard clichés lining up for the body count" than real action heroes.

Lou Lumenick of the New York Post gave the film a positive review by stating that, "After 23 years and three attempts, Predators finally delivers a solid sequel to the Arnold Schwarzenegger B-movie classic." He added that, "It's not exactly hard to predict who the survivors will be at the end of Predators, but it's a fun ride."

Accolades

Other media

Sequel

Nimród Antal had talked about a direct sequel to Predators and said he would love to do one. Rodriguez has said that he has interest in a sequel because of the large number of potential ideas the Predator planet setting provides:

In 2010, Rodriguez confirmed that there would eventually be a Predators sequel:

Adrien Brody also spoke about reprising his role in a possible sequel:

In June 2014, Fox announced plans for a new film, with Shane Black co-writing and directing, Fred Dekker co-writing and John Davis producing (without the involvement of Rodriguez). At the time, Black said the film is a sequel, rather than a reboot, while Davis said the film would "reinvent the franchise". It was explained that since the plot takes place on Earth, the story will be more closely linked to the first two films; while the film acknowledges the events of Predator and Predator 2, but before the events of Predators.

Comic books
A four issue tie-in Predators comic book by Dark Horse Comics was released weekly from June 9 to June 30 to promote the release of the film. The comic series, consisting of two storylines titled "Welcome to the Jungle" and "A Predatory Life", serves as a prequel to the events depicted in the film. On July 14, a 72-page one-shot adaptation of the film was released, showing more back story of the characters Royce and Isabelle than is depicted in the film. On the same day a one-shot sequel comic titled "Preserve the Game" was also released, depicting the further adventures of Royce and Isabelle two months after the events of the film.

Toys
In July 2010, NECA released the Classic Predator, Falconer Predator, and Berserker Predator action figures. NECA later released a second series of figures in December, consisting of a masked Classic Predator, an unmasked Berserker Predator, and the Tracker Predator. The Predator hound was released in March 2011. Hot Toys and Sideshow Collectibles have also created props, maquettes and figures for the film.

Video games

Downloadable games publisher Chillingo secured a licensing agreement with Fox Digital Entertainment to publish the official Predators video game for the iPhone, iPod Touch and iPad through Apple's App Store. The game was developed by independent game developer Angry Mob Games and was released on July 1, 2010, a week before the film's theatrical release. The game was later ported to Android and published by Fox Digital Entertainment in 2012.

See also

 Nimród Antal filmography
 List of action films of the 2010s

Notes

References

External links

2010 films
2010s adventure films
2010s monster movies
2010 science fiction action films
2010s science fiction horror films
20th Century Fox films
Alien abduction films
American monster movies
American science fiction action films
American science fiction adventure films
American science fiction horror films
American sequel films
Davis Entertainment films
Dune Entertainment films
Films about United States Army Special Forces
Films about extraterrestrial life
Films based on short fiction
Films based on thriller novels
Films directed by Nimród Antal
Films produced by Elizabeth Avellán
Films produced by John Davis
Films produced by Robert Rodriguez
Films scored by John Debney
Films set in 2018
Films set in forests
Films set on fictional planets
Films shot in Hawaii
Films shot in Texas
Predator (franchise) films
Troublemaker Studios films
Films about mercenaries
2010s English-language films
2010s American films